Gobius gasteveni, Steven's goby, is a species of goby native to the Eastern Atlantic Ocean where it is known to occur in the Irish sea as far north as the Isle of Man, the western part of the English Channel south as far as Madeira and the Canary Islands. This species can reach a length of  TL. The common name and the specific name both honour the British ichthyologist G. A. Steven BSc FRSE (1901-1958), of the Plymouth Marine Laboratory, who worked extensively on the fish fauna of the English Channel and who identified this species as being new to that area.

References

Steven's goby
Fish of the East Atlantic
Marine fish of Europe
Fauna of Madeira
Steven's goby